is a Japanese actress, fashion model, gravure idol, variety and tarento.

Biography
Hisamatsu was born in Tokyo. After being scouted in Harajuku, she worked as an exclusive model for Hanachu in 2008.

Hisamatsu later became an exclusive model of CanCam starting with its October issue released in August 2012. In addition, she became member of Koi Miha that was formed in that issue.

In November 2013, Hisamatsu became the Sanai Swimsuit Image Girl of 2014.

She graduated from Nikaido High School from the Japan Women's College of Physical Education. In April 2014, Hisamatsu later entered Asia University School of Management.

Filmography

Television

TV dramas

Variety

Radio

Advertisements

Films

Internet programmes

Catalogues

Others

Bibliography

Magazine serialisations

References

Notes

External links
 
 – Ameba Blog 

1996 births
Living people
21st-century Japanese actresses
Japanese female models
Japanese gravure models
Japanese television personalities
People from Tokyo
Models from Tokyo Metropolis